Caupolicán Ovalles may refer to:
 Caupolicán Ovalles (writer)
 Caupolicán Ovalles (filmmaker)